Ephraim Leister Acker (January 11, 1827 – May 12, 1903) was an American newspaperman and educator who served one term as a Democratic member of the U.S. House of Representatives from Pennsylvania from 1871 to 1873.

Early life  and career
Ephraim L. Acker was born in Marlborough Township, Montgomery County, Pennsylvania. He attended the common schools and the academy at Sumneytown, a village in Marlborough Township. He graduated from Marshall College in Mercersburg, Pennsylvania, in 1847. He was a school teacher for two years, and graduated from the University of Pennsylvania School of Medicine in Philadelphia in March 1852. He was editor and publisher of the Norristown Register from 1853 to 1877. 

He served as superintendent of the schools of Montgomery County, Pennsylvania, from June 1854 to June 1860. He was appointed postmaster of Norristown, Pennsylvania in March 1860 by President James Buchanan and after serving eleven months was removed by President Abraham Lincoln. He served as inspector of Montgomery County Prison for three years.

Congress 
Acker was elected as a Democrat to the Forty-second Congress. He was an unsuccessful candidate for reelection in 1872.

Later career and death 
He resumed the publication of his newspaper until 1877, when he began the study of law, graduating from the University of Pennsylvania Law School in 1886. He was admitted to the bar and practiced until his death in Norristown in 1903. 

He was interred in Norris City Cemetery in East Norriton Township.

References

Sources

The Political Graveyard

1827 births
1903 deaths
People from Montgomery County, Pennsylvania
Physicians from Pennsylvania
Pennsylvania lawyers
19th-century American newspaper publishers (people)
Democratic Party members of the United States House of Representatives from Pennsylvania
Pennsylvania postmasters
Franklin & Marshall College alumni
Perelman School of Medicine at the University of Pennsylvania alumni
19th-century American politicians
University of Pennsylvania Law School alumni